= Vamos a Alabar =

Song by Oscar Medina

from the album Corazones de Piedra
- Released: 1985
- Genre: Christian
- Songwriter: Oscar Medina

Vamos a Alabar, sometimes also known as Levantate, is a Spanish language Christian song that has been recorded by many Christian artists across Latin America, including Wanda Batista, the United Methodist Church's "Ebenezer" band in Puerto Rico and others. The song is sung both in Protestant and Catholic churches.
