= Wanda Batista =

Puerto Rican singer

- Born: 1958 (age 66–67); Ponce, Puerto Rico
- Genres: Gospel
- Occupation: Singer
- Website: wb1.wandabatista.com

Wanda Batista (born 1958) is a Puerto Rican gospel singer. She has released six albums.

== Biography ==
Batista was born and raised in Ponce, Puerto Rico. At the age of 19, she became a singer. In 1987, Batista released her first album.

== Discography ==
- A Ti Jehova
- Tu Podras Vencer
- Vision Celestial
- Tienes Que Cambiar (1987)
- Le Vere (1993)
- Porque Eres Bueno (2011)

== See also ==
- List of Puerto Ricans
